Jean Brun (28 September 1926 – 30 September 1993) was a Swiss cyclist. He competed in the individual and team road race events at the 1948 Summer Olympics.

References

External links
 

1926 births
1993 deaths
Swiss male cyclists
Olympic cyclists of Switzerland
Cyclists at the 1948 Summer Olympics
Cyclists from Geneva